There are over 190 vascular plant species on the Norwegian Arctic archipelago of Svalbard. This figure does not include algae, mosses, and lichens, which are non-vascular plants. For an island so far north, this number of species constitutes an astonishing variety of plant life. Because of the harsh climate and the short growing season, all the plants are slow growing. They seldom grow higher than 

In some areas, especially in warmer valleys, the plants produce carpets of blossoms. Svalbard has been divided into four vegetation zones.

Plant species

Acorus calamus L. (introduced)
Alchemilla glabra Neygenf. (doubtful)
Alchemilla subcrenata Buser (introduced)
Alopecurus magellanicus Lam.
Anthoxanthum monticola (Bigelow) Veldkamp
Arabis alpina  L. – Alpine rock-cress
Arctagrostis latifolia (R.Br.) Griseb.
Arctium lappa L.
× Arctodupontia scleroclada (Rupr.) Tzvelev
Arenaria humifusa Wahlenb.
Arenaria pseudofrigida (Ostenf. & O.C.Dahl) Steffen – fringed sandwort
Barbarea vulgaris W.T.Aiton (introduced)
Betula nana L. – dwarf birch
Bistorta vivipara (L.) Delarbre
Braya purpurascens (R.Br.) Bunge ex Ledeb. – purplish braya
Cakile arctica Pobed. (extinct in Svalbard)
Calamagrostis purpurascens R.Br.
Calamagrostis stricta (Timm) Koeler
Callitriche stagnalis Scop.
Campanula giesekiana Vest ex Schult.
Capsella bursa-pastoris (L.) Medik. (introduced)
Cardamine bellidifolia L.
Cardamine nymanii Gand. – polar cress
Carex bigelowii Torr. ex Schwein.
Carex capillaris L.
Carex dioica L.
Carex × flavicans (F.Nyl.) F.Nyl.
Carex fuliginosa Schkuhr
Carex glacialis Mack.
Carex glareosa Schkuhr ex Wahlenb.
Carex incurviformis Mack.
Carex krausei Boeckeler
Carex lachenalii Schkuhr
Carex × langeana Fernald
Carex × lidii Hadac
Carex marina Dewey
Carex maritima Gunnerus
Carex nardina (Hornem.) Fr.
Carex parallela (Laest.) Sommerf.
Carex × reducta Drejer
Carex rupestris All.
Carex saxatilis L.
Carex subspathacea Wormsk. ex Hornem.
Carex ursina Dewey
Carum carvi L. (introduced)
Cassiope hypnoides (L.) D.Don
Cassiope tetragona (L.) D.Don – Arctic bell-heather
Cerastium alpinum L.
Cerastium arcticum Lange – Arctic mouse-ear chickweed
Cerastium bialynickii Tolm.
Cerastium regelii Ostenf.
Cherleria biflora (L.) A.J.Moore & Dillenb.
Chrysosplenium tetrandrum (N.Lund) Th.Fr.
Cochlearia groenlandica L.
Comastoma tenellum (Rottb.) Toyok.
Cystopteris fragilis (L.) Bernh.
Deschampsia cespitosa (L.) P.Beauv.
Dichodon cerastoides (L.) Rchb.
Draba × algida Adams ex DC.
Draba alpina L.
Draba arctica J.Vahl
Draba × asplundii O.E.Schulz (endemic)
Draba cinerea Adams
Draba corymbosa R.Br. ex DC.
Draba daurica DC.
Draba fladnizensis Wulfen
Draba hirta L.
Draba lactea Adams – Lapland whitlow-grass
Draba × lastrungica O.E.Schulz (endemic)
Draba micropetala Hook.
Draba nivalis Lilj.
Draba norvegica Gunnerus
Draba oxycarpa Sommerf.
Draba pauciflora R.Br.
Draba × schaeferi O.E.Schulz (endemic)
Draba subcapitata Simmons
Draba × ursorum Gand. (endemic)
Drosera rotundifolia L.
Dryas octopetala L. – mountain avens
Dupontia fisheri R.Br.
Empetrum nigrum L. – crowberry
Epilobium anagallidifolium Lam.
Equisetum arvense L.
Equisetum scirpoides Michx.
Eriophorum angustifolium Honck.
Eriophorum scheuchzeri Hoppe – Arctic cottongrass
Euphrasia frigida Pugsley
Eutrema edwardsii R.Br.
Festuca baffinensis Polunin
Festuca brachyphylla Schult. & Schult.f.
Festuca heteromalla Pourr.
Festuca hyperborea Holmen
Festuca richardsonii Hook.
Festuca rubra L.
Festuca vivipara (L.) Sm.
Galium aparine L.
Hippuris vulgaris L.
Honckenya peploides (L.) Ehrh.
Huperzia appressa (Bach.Pyl. ex Desv.) Á.Löve & D.Löve
Huperzia selago (L.) Bernh. ex Schrank & Mart.
Juncus arcticus Willd.
Juncus biglumis L.
Juncus castaneus Sm.
Juncus effusus L.
Juncus squarrosus L. (introduced)
Juncus triglumis L.
Koenigia islandica L.
Lemna minor L.
Lolium pratense (Huds.) Darbysh.
Luzula arcuata (Wahlenb.) Sw.
Luzula confusa Lindeb. – Arctic wood-rush
Luzula nivalis (Laest.) Spreng. – tundra wood-rush
Luzula spicata (L.) DC.
Luzula wahlenbergii Rupr.
Melica uniflora Retz.
Mentha arvensis L.
Mertensia maritima (L.) Gray – oysterleaf
Micranthes foliolosa (R.Br.) Gornall
Micranthes hieraciifolia (Waldst. & Kit. ex Willd.) Haw.
Micranthes nivalis (L.) Small
Micranthes tenuis (Wahlenb.) Small
Omalotheca supina (L.) DC.
Origanum vulgare L.
Oxyria digyna (L.) Hill – mountain sorrel
Papaver dahlianum Nordh. – Svalbard poppy
Papaver radicatum Rottb.
Pedicularis dasyantha Hadac – woolly lousewort
Pedicularis hirsuta L. – hairy lousewort
Phippsia algida (Sol.) R.Br.
Phippsia concinna (Th.Fr.) Lindeb.
Pleuropogon sabinei R.Br.
Poa abbreviata R.Br.
Poa alpigena Lindm.
Poa alpina L. – Alpine meadow-grass
Poa arctica R.Br.
Poa glauca Vahl
Poa hartzii Gand.
Poa pratensis L.
Polemonium boreale Adams – boreal Jacobs-ladder
Polygonum aviculare L.
Potentilla chamissonis Hultén – bluff cinquefoil
Potentilla crantzii (Crantz) Beck ex Fritsch
Potentilla hyparctica Malte – Arctic cinquefoil
Potentilla × insularis Soják (endemic)
Potentilla × prostrata Rottb.
Potentilla pulchella R.Br. – tufted cinquefoil
Potentilla sommerfeltii Lehm.
Puccinellia angustata (R.Br.) E.L.Rand & Redfield
Puccinellia phryganodes (Trin.) Scribn. & Merr. – cushioned saltmarsh grass
Puccinellia tenella (Lange) Holmb.
Puccinellia vahliana (Liebm.) Scribn. & Merr.
× Pucciphippsia vacillans (Th.Fr.) Tzvelev
Ranunculus acris L. (introduced)
Ranunculus glacialis L.
Ranunculus hyperboreus Rottb. – Arctic buttercup
Ranunculus lapponicus L. – Lapland buttercup
Ranunculus nivalis L. – snow buttercup
Ranunculus pallasii Schltdl.
Ranunculus pygmaeus Wahlenb. – pygmy buttercup
Ranunculus × spitsbergensis Hadac
Ranunculus sulphureus Sol. – sulphur-coloured buttercup
Rhodiola rosea L.
Rubus chamaemorus L. – cloudberry
Rumex acetosella L.
Sabulina rossii (R.Br. ex Richardson) Dillenb. & Kadereit
Sabulina rubella (Wahlenb.) Dillenb. & Kadereit
Sabulina stricta (Sw.) Rchb.
Sagina caespitosa Lange
Sagina nivalis (Lindblad) Fr.
Salix herbacea L. – snowbed willow
Salix polaris Wahlenb. – polar willow
Salix reticulata L.
Saxifraga aizoides L. – yellow mountain saxifrage
Saxifraga cernua L. – drooping saxifrage
Saxifraga cespitosa L. – tufted saxifrage
Saxifraga hirculus L. – bog saxifrage
Saxifraga hyperborea R.Br.
Saxifraga oppositifolia L. – purple saxifrage
Saxifraga rivularis L. – brook saxifrage
Saxifraga svalbardensis Øvstedal (endemic)
Schoenus nigricans L.
Sibbaldia procumbens L.
Silene acaulis (L.) Jacq. – moss campion
Silene involucrata (Cham. & Schltdl.) Bocquet
Silene uralensis (Rupr.) Bocquet
Stellaria crassipes Hultén – chickweed
Stellaria humifusa Rottb. – Arctic chickweed
Stellaria longipes Goldie
Stellaria media (L.) Vill.
Taraxacum amphiphron Böcher (endemic)
Taraxacum brachyrhynchum G.E.Haglund (endemic)
Taraxacum croceum Dahlst. ex Andersson
Taraxacum cymbifolium H.Lindb. ex Dahlst.
Taraxacum recedens (Dahlst.) G.E.Haglund (endemic)
Taraxacum torvum G.E.Haglund (endemic)
Thinopyrum junceiforme (Á.Löve & D.Löve) Á.Löve
Tofieldia pusilla (Michx.) Pers.
Trisetum spicatum (L.) K.Richt.
Vaccinium uliginosum L. – bog bilberry
Veronica alpina L.
Vicia sativa L.
Viola canina L.
Viola nemoralis Kütz.
Woodsia glabella R.Br.

References

 
Environment of Svalbard
Svalbard
Natural history of Norway